Le Jardin du Luxembourg is a song by Joe Dassin. It was the first track of side 1 of his 1976 album Le Jardin du Luxembourg. The female vocals are by Dominique Poulain.

Writing and versions 
The song was written specially for Dassin by Vito Pallavicini and Toto Cutugno. The French lyrics were written by Claude Lemesle.

The song will be later covered by Dassin himself in Spanish under the title "En los jardines de mi ciudad".

The Italian version (by Vito Pallavicini and Toto Cutugno), titled "Quindici minuti di un uomo", was recorded by Albatros (a band founded by Toto Cutugno).

Release 
The song was released as a two-part promo single.

Composition and reception 
According to the producer Jacques Plait, it is a "song / symphony / one-man musical", its main theme is "One more day without love".

The song lasts almost a quarter of an hour. "The most amazing thing," Dassin recounted, "is that with this song I found myself at the top of the charts at Canadian radio."

Track listing 
7" promo single CBS 4858 (1976)
A. "Le Jardin du Luxembourg" (1ėre Partie) (6:37)
B. "Le Jardin du Luxembourg" (2e Partie) (5:23)

Other covers 
 2013: Hélène Ségara with Joe Dassin on the album Et si tu n'existais pas

References 

1976 songs
1976 singles
Joe Dassin songs
French songs
CBS Disques singles
Songs written by Toto Cutugno
Songs with lyrics by Vito Pallavicini
Songs written by Claude Lemesle
Song recordings produced by Jacques Plait